Henry Fox-Strangways may refer to:
Henry Fox-Strangways, 2nd Earl of Ilchester
 Henry Fox-Strangways, 3rd Earl of Ilchester
Henry Fox-Strangways, 5th Earl of Ilchester

See also

Henry Fox (disambiguation)
Henry Strangways (disambiguation)